The following is a list of notable University of Memphis people, including alumni, notable faculty members and administrators, and others affiliated with the University of Memphis.

Notable alumni

Government, public service, and public policy
Rex Armistead – private detective, investigator for the defunct Mississippi State Sovereignty Commission and the Arkansas Project
 Arthur Barclay (born 1982) – politician who has represented the 5th Legislative District in the New Jersey General Assembly since 2016
Thomas G. Carpenter – former President of the University of Memphis 
Robert N. Clement – former U.S. Congressman 
 Bernice Donald – judge, United States district court 
 Bob Fisher, president of Belmont University since 2000.
John Ford – Tennessee politician
Tre Hargett- Secretary of State, Tennessee
Willie Herenton – Mayor, City of Memphis 
Ed Jackson – Republican state senator
James F. Kyle – State Senator, Tennessee Legislature 
David Lillard – Tennessee state treasurer since 2009
Ed McAteer – leader of the Christian right and founder of the Religious Roundtable; attended but did not graduate
Viola Harris Mcferren – civil rights activist 
Curtis S. Person Jr. – former State Senator, Tennessee Legislature
Van B. Poole (Class of 1958) – former member of both houses of the Florida Legislature
 Frank Scott Jr., current mayor of Little Rock, AR
 J. Millard Smith – former President of the University of Memphis
 Jim Strickland – mayor of Memphis 
 Fred Thompson – actor and former U.S. Senator

Literature, arts, and media
 Dixie Carter – actress 
Kellye Cash – Miss America 1987 
Eric Jerome Dickey – author 
John Dye – actor
Johanna Edwards – bestselling novelist
Galen Fott — director and animator
Brian A. Hopkins - award-winning author
Barbara Walker Hummel – Miss America 1947 
 Jason Isbell – recording artist and songwriter, member of The 400 Unit and Drive-By Truckers 
Michael Jeter - actor
Dickey Lee – recording artist and songwriter
Terry Manning – music producer, photographer
Les McCurdy - Stand Up Comedian, producer, owner McCurdys Comedy Theatre & Humor Institute Sarasota Fl. Est. 1988
 Gary Parrish – sports columnist, radio host and television analyst
Edmund Warren Perry Jr. – writer
William Sanderson – actor 
Stella Stevens — actress 
J. Karen Thomas – actress (Drop Dead Diva, Nashville)
Pat Kerr Tigrett – fashion designer 
Trenyce – singer, American Idol finalist 
 Cara Notestine - Photographer

Business
Melissa Arnoldi – President of Technology and Operations, AT&T
Martin Belz – President of Belz Enterprises
William Dunavant – Chairman of Dunavant Enterprises 
R. Brad Martin – Chairman of the Board/CEO, Saks Incorporated

Athletics

 Dave Anderson – multiple teams, MLB 
 Vincent Askew – multiple teams, NBA
 Earl Barron – NBA 
 Will Barton – Denver Nuggets, NBA 
 William Bedford –  multiple teams, NBA
 Isaac Bruce – San Francisco 49ers, St. Louis Rams, NFL 
 Antonio Burks – NBA 
 Mike Butler – professional basketball player with New Orleans Buccaneers and Utah Stars 
 Rodney Carney – Golden St. Warriors, NBA 
 Joey Dorsey – Toronto Raptors, NBA 
 Chris Douglas-Roberts – Milwaukee Bucks, NBA 
 Tyreke Evans – Sacramento Kings, NBA 
 Larry Finch – Memphis TAMs, ABA
 T. J. Frier – football player
 Stephen Gostkowski – New England Patriots, NFL 
 Earnest Gray – NFL, New York Giants
 Sylvester Gray – Miami Heat, NBA
 Penny Hardaway – NBA 
 Chad Harville – multiple teams, MLB 
 Cedric Henderson – Utah Jazz, NBA 
 Richard Jones – New York Nets, NBA 
 Larry Kenon – multiple teams, NBA
 Bill Laurie – 1973 NCAA Championship game starting point guard for Memphis State
 Jerry Lawler – Hall of Fame professional wrestler, WWE 
 Ronald Leary – Dallas Cowboys, NFL 
 Keith Lee – New Jersey Nets, NBA 
 James Logan – Houston Oilers, Seattle Seahawks, NFL
 Steve Matthews – Kansas City Chiefs, NFL 
 Hank McDowell – multiple teams, NBA 
 Mike McKenzie – New Orleans Saints, NFL
  Andy Nelson - Baltimore Colts, NFL
 Lloyd Patterson – Saskatchewan Roughriders
 Ryan Peniston - British Tennis Player
 Elliot Perry – Phoenix Suns, NBA 
 Derrick Rose – Chicago Bulls, NBA 
 Harry Schuh – All-American Tackle, played for Oakland Raiders, LA Rams and Green Bay Packers 
Jack Smith – Philadelphia Eagles, NFL
 Cliff Taylor – multiple teams, NFL 
 Andre Turner –  multiple teams, NBA 
 Dan Uggla – Atlanta Braves, MLB 
 David Vaughn – multiple teams, NBA
 Dajuan Wagner – Cleveland Cavaliers, NBA 
 Darius Washington – NBA 
 Tamika Whitmore – Indiana Fever, WNBA 
 Win Wilfong – Cincinnati Royals, NBA 
 DeAngelo Williams – Pittsburgh Steelers, NFL 
 Shawne Williams – New York Knicks, NBA 
 Francis Winkler – Green Bay Packers, NFL 
 Jerome Woods – Kansas City Chiefs, NFL 
 Keith Wright – NFL, Cleveland Browns
 Lorenzen Wright – multiple teams, NBA 
 Wayne Yates – Los Angeles Lakers, NBA 
 Jim Hardin - Baltimore Orioles New York Yankees Atlanta Braves Major League Baseball Pitcher

Notable professors and scholars
 Richard Bausch – novelist and short story writer; Moss Chair of Excellence in English at the University of Memphis
 Béla Bollobás – mathematician; known for his work in combinatorics; Fields Medal winner Timothy Gowers' dissertation advisor
 Peter J. Brand – Egyptologist
 Joyce Cobb – jazz vocalist
Jack Cooper – jazz composer, arranger
Miriam DeCosta-Willis – first African American faculty member at what was then Memphis State University
 Ralph Faudree – mathematician with a focus on Ramsey theory; provost of the university
 Robert Fisher – MBA, president of Belmont University
 Stan Franklin – cognitive scientist; proponent of artificial consciousness
 Arthur C. Graesser – cognitive psychologist; editor of the Journal of Educational Psychology
 Jessie Mae Hemphill – electric guitarist, songwriter, and vocalist specializing in Southern music
 Benjamin Hooks – civil rights leader
 Xiangen Hu – professor in cognitive psychology 
 John Lee – author, professor of English
 Michael Leff – scholar of rhetoric
Jennifer R. Mandel – professor of biology
 Milton C. Moreland – archaeologist and president of Centre College
 Cecil C. Rousseau – mathematician and author who specializes in graph theory and combinatorics
 Rebecca Skloot – New York Times bestselling science writer, professor of English

Coaches
 John Calipari – Kentucky basketball coach
 Penny Hardaway – Memphis basketball coach 
 Dana Kirk – Memphis basketball coach
 Josh Pastner –  Memphis basketball coach
 Tic Price – Memphis basketball coach

Other
 Stan Bronson Jr. – Guinness World Record holder batboy for Memphis Tigers baseball

References

Lists of people by university or college in Tennessee